Kementerian Kesihatan may refer to:
 Ministry of Health (Brunei), a government ministry in Brunei
 Ministry of Health (Malaysia), a federal government ministry in Malaysia
 Ministry of Health (Singapore), a government ministry in Singapore